National Tertiary Route 504, or just Route 504 (or ) is a National Road Route of Costa Rica, located in the Heredia province.

Description
In Heredia province the route covers Santo Domingo canton (Tures, Pará districts).

References

Highways in Costa Rica